David Luongo (born 13 March 1988) is a French professional footballer who plays as a striker.

Career
After playing for Swiss clubs FC Meyrin, CS Chênois and Stade Nyonnais, Luongo signed for Scottish club Livingston in June 2012, alongside Anthony Andreu. He never appeared for the club, and left the following summer.

References

1988 births
Living people
French footballers
FC Meyrin players
CS Chênois players
FC Stade Nyonnais players
Livingston F.C. players
Swiss Challenge League players
Association football forwards
French expatriate footballers
French expatriate sportspeople in Switzerland
Expatriate footballers in Switzerland
French expatriate sportspeople in Scotland
Expatriate footballers in Scotland